Mokichi is a masculine Japanese given name. Notable people with the name include:

, Japanese religious leader
, Japanese poet

Japanese masculine given names